The austral thrush (Turdus falcklandii) is a medium-sized thrush from southern South America. There are two subspecies, the Magellan thrush (T. f. magellanicus) from south Argentina and south and central Chile, and the Falkland thrush (T. f. falcklandii) from the Falkland Islands.

The austral thrush is similar to the European blackbird, also of the genus Turdus, with a yellow bill and feet, a dark brown head, back and wings and paler underparts. The smaller T. f. magellanicus is more olive below, while in  T. f. falcklandii the underside tends towards ochre. Both subspecies have streaked throats.

In Chile and Argentina the austral thrush lives in a variety of habitats from Nothofagus forests to agricultural lands and even gardens. On the Falkland Islands it makes use of human altered habitat as well but is most numerous in tussac grasses near beaches.

Gallery

References

Collar, N. J. (2005) Family Turdidae (Thrushes) pp. 514–811 in: del Hoyo. J., Elliott, A., Sargatal, J., (eds), Handbook of the Birds of the World, Volume Ten, Cuckoo-shrikes to Thrushes,

External links
Videos on the Internet Bird Collection
Stamps (for Chile, Falkland Islands) with a range map
Photo gallery on VIREO
Photo; Article sunbirdtours
Photo; Article railwaytouring.co.uk

austral thrush
Birds of Chile
Birds of Patagonia
Birds of the Falkland Islands
austral thrush